Mordella metasternalis is a species of beetle in the genus Mordella of the family Mordellidae, which is part of the superfamily Tenebrionoidea. The species was first described in 1917.

References

Beetles described in 1917
metasternalis